Sud Oranais – Gourara is a Glottolog classification that includes:
 Gurara language, spoken in Algeria
 South Oran and Figuig Berber, spoken in Algeria and Morocco

References

Glottolog languages that correspond to more than one Wikipedia article